Andreea Ehritt-Vanc (born 6 October 1973) is a Romanian former professional tennis player. Vanc played predominantly in doubles; and has won two WTA Tour titles. Her best result at the Grand Slam tournaments is third round: at the 2005 Australian Open and the 2005 French Open. She achieved her career-high rank of No. 40 on 8 May 2006.

WTA career finals

Doubles: 6

Wins (2)

Runner-ups (4)

ITF Circuit finals

Singles: 21 (13–8)

Doubles: 49 (24–25)

External links

 
 
 

Sportspeople from Timișoara
Romanian expatriates in Italy
Romanian female tennis players
1973 births
Living people